Uniform is an American industrial metal band, formed in 2013 in New York by vocalist Michael Berdan and guitarist Ben Greenberg. The current line-up of the band features Mike Sharp on drums.

History
Greenberg previously played with The Men and Pygmy Shrews whereas Berdan sang for Drunkdriver and York Factory Complaint. The band came together after Greenberg and Berdan, who played in bands 3 years prior, started living on the same street. The duo recorded their eponymous 12" single, which was released in 2014. Their debut studio album, 2015's Perfect World, was issued on Alter Records. For the release of 2016's Ghosthouse EP, the band signed to Sacred Bones Records.

2017 saw the release of the band's second album, Wake in Fright. Following the tour with experimental metal band The Body, Berdan contributed to their 2018 album I Have Fought Against It, But I Can't Any Longer., and the bands released a collaborative record Mental Wounds Not Healing. The band also enlisted Liturgy and Zs drummer Greg Fox for its third studio album, 2018's The Long Walk. A second collaborative album with The Body, titled Everything That Dies Someday Comes Back, was issued in 2019. In January 2020, the band released the track "Awakening" as a part of the Adult Swim single series. In June 2020, the band announced their fourth album, Shame, and released its lead single "Delco".  The second single from the album, "Dispatches From the Gutter," was released in July 2020 with an accompanying music video. Released on September 11, 2020, the record was mixed by Randall Dunn and features Mike Sharp on drums. In the same year, the band contributed the track "Catholic Town" to Jesse Draxler's compilation, Reigning Cement.

Musical style
Uniform's style has been described as industrial metal, noise rock, industrial rock and industrial punk. The band incorporates elements from industrial music, thrash metal and power electronics; according to Luca Cimarusti of Chicago Reader, the band "continually streamlined their sound, toying with Wax Trax! industrial, straightforward punk, and electronic synth swaths—sometimes all at once." Their second record,Wake in Fright, has brought together elements from EBM, hardcore and noise, while "leaning more heavily towards their hardcore and metal heritage" than their debut album, Perfect. AllMusic's Paul Simpson compared the record to "an overdriven version of Ministry's most thrash-influenced material, while likening Berdan's vocals to those of David Yow and "a severely electroshocked David Thomas." Pitchfork's Andy O'Connor has compared the "mangled, mid-paced guitar riffs" on The Long Walk to "Celtic Frost recorded through a series of budget amps and distortion pedals, then played at deafening volume."

The band's live setup features heavy use of drum machines, bass synthesizers and multiple guitar amplifiers; Berdan additionally works on electronic instruments such as synthesizers and sequencers while Greenberg handles drum programming, synthesizer parts and production. Perfect World was recorded with a single bass synthesizer and a drum machine; for its follow-up Wake in Fright, the band sought to "get a bigger sound" by the use of sampling and sequencing on Pro Tools. Samples of gunshots and explosions were also used to produce rhythm tracks. Introduction of on Greg Fox's live drums on The Long Walk necessitated pre-production and modifications on Greenberg's guitar rig; his modified rig enabled him to trigger the bass synthesizer while playing the guitar. Live drums on the follow-up record,  Shame, were performed by Mike Sharp; the record featured "various shades of heavy, electronically charged rock," while incorporating elements from doom metal, black metal and thrash metal.

Members
Current members
Michael Berdan — vocals, electronics (2013—present)
Ben Greenberg — guitar, bass, programming, electronics (2013—present)
Mike Sharp — drums, electronics (2019—present)

Past members
Greg Fox — drums, electronics (2017—2018)

Touring members
Blaze Bateh — drums (2019)

Discography
Studio albums
 Perfect World (2015)
 Wake in Fright (2017)
 The Long Walk (2018)
 Shame (2020)

Collaborative albums
 Mental Wounds Not Healing (2018; with The Body)
 Everything That Dies Someday Comes Back (2019; with The Body)
 Live at the End of the World (2020; live album with The Body)
EPs
 Ghosthouse (2016)

Singles
 "Our Blood" / "Of Sound Mind and Body" (2014)
 "Ghosthouse" (2016)
 "Tabloid" (2016)
 "The Killing of America" (2017)
 "Come and See" (2018; with The Body)
 "The Walk" (2018)
 "Penance" (2019; with The Body)
 "Not Good Enough" (2019; with The Body)
 "Awakening" (2020)
 "Delco" (2020)
 "Dispatches From the Gutter" (2020)
 "Shame" (2020)

Music videos
 "Tabloid" (2016; dir. Jim Larson)
 "The Killing of America" (2017; dir. Yussef Cole)
 "The Walk" (2018; dir. Danny Perez)
 "Day of Atonement" (2019; dir. Alexander Barton; with The Body)
 "Dispatches From the Gutter" (2020; dir. Jacqueline Castel)
 "Life in Remission" (2020; dir. A.F. Cortes)
 "The Shadow of God’s Hand" (2021; dir. John Bradburn)

References

External links
 
 

Musical groups established in 2013
Rock music duos
American noise rock music groups
American industrial metal musical groups
Rock music groups from New York (state)
Heavy metal musical groups from New York (state)
Musical groups from New York City
American musical duos
American musical trios
Sacred Bones Records artists
2013 establishments in New York City
Heavy metal duos